Charles Adam Marie  Wroblewski (1855 – 24 July 1936) was an Australian analytical chemist, importer and newspaper owner. Wroblewski was born in Grodno, Belarus and died in St Kilda, Victoria.

Wroblewski launched the French language newspaper, Le Courrier Australien, in 1892, and the German language newspaper, Deutsch-Australische Post, in 1893.

See also

 Sir Henry Parkes
 Jean Emile Serisier

References

Australian chemists
Australian newspaper publishers (people)
Australian people of Lithuanian descent
Emigrants from the Russian Empire to Australia
1855 births
1936 deaths
People from Grodno
Australian people of Polish descent